Hacquetia is the scientific name of two genera of organisms and may refer to:

Hacquetia (fish), a genus of prehistoric fishes in the order Clupeiformes
 Hacquetia (journal), academic journal from Slovenia
Hacquetia, a former plant genus in the family Apiaceae with the only species now Sanicula epipactis